Annigoni: Portrait of an Artist is a 1995 documentary film about the life and times of Italian portrait painter Pietro Annigoni.

Production
Principal photography began in October 1990 in Florence, Italy, and lasted four years. Annigoni: Portrait of an Artist had its World Premiere on October 23, 1995, at the historic and largest movie theatre in Toronto, The Bloor Cinema. It played to sold-out audiences during its entire week long run. It was followed by the Italian premiere in Florence, Italy. The Television Broadcast Premiere was on BRAVO! on March 3, 1996.

Synopsis
The film begins with a panoramic shot of dark rain clouds gathering over the city of Florence. The voice over of Pietro Annigoni strains from beyond, "I signed my work using the cipher C followed by three crosses representing the via cruicis, the hard road to the cross which the artist must travel." The story that follows is based on Annigoni's diaries, documenting his work, his travels, his loves but mostly his thoughts on life and art.

Major film locations
 Convent of San Marco, Florence
 Palazzo Venerosi-Pesciolini, Florence
 Santo Spirito, Florence
 Chiesa di San Lorenzo, Florence
 Florence Academy of Art
 Cattedrale di Santa Maria del Fiore, Florence
 Convento del Bosco ai Frati, San Piero a Sieve
 Cattedrale di San Antonio, Padova
 Chiesa di San Martino, Castagno d'Andrea Italy
 Mount Falterona, Castagno d'Andrea Italy
 La Stazione di Sante Maria Novella, Florence
 Ghislieri College, Pavia
 Montecatini, Italy
 Rainbow Studios Florence, Italy
 Toronto, Ontario, Canada

Original music soundtrack
Original music from Annigoni: Portrait of an Artist, performed in concert from Florence on YouTube.

Stefano Burbi composed and conducted the award-winning musical score for the film. His orchestra, The Orchestra da Camera Nova Harmonia di Firenze was created for the film and now continues as Mr. Burbi's orchestra. A sample of the soundtrack of Stefano Burbi: Suite dalle musiche per il film 'Annigoni: Portrait of an Artist''' soundtrack can be found below in external links.

Burbi describes his inspiration for Annigoni'' as, "music of memory and nostalgia, it is melancholic because we remember, like Annigoni, a paradise lost".

Awards and honors
 Best Musical Score - 1996 Hot Docs International Film Festival
 Award of Merit - Arts & Humanities - 1996 Chicago International Film Festival

References

External links

 Official Annigoni website
 
 
 Annigoni mixes paint - British Pathé
 Royal Academy Exhibition 1955 - British Pathé
 The Art of Annigoni 1958 - British Pathé
 The Knife Thrower
 IMDB movie database

1995 films
Documentary films about painters
1995 documentary films
Documentary films about Italy
Italian documentary films
Canadian documentary films
1990s Canadian films
Italian-language Canadian films